Seán Mac Mahon (born John Michael McMahon, 15 September 1893 – 26 March 1955) was an Irish nationalist who fought in the 1916 rising.

Early life 
He was born John Michael McMahon on Friday 15 September 1893 at 118 Cork Street in Dublin. His mother was Mary, formerly Delaney, and his father, Edward McMahon, was just 2 weeks from his 25th birthday. His father would later become a maltster in Cork Street.

He was the eldest of 7 children, with 4 brothers and 2 sisters. Pat (Patrick) born 23 July 1897, the twins Ned (Edward) and Tom (Thomas) born on 4 December 1902 and Joe (Joseph) born 7 July 1909. The girls were Annie, born 21 September 1895 and Kathleen (Catherine) born 9 November 1900.

After leaving school on 26 September 1907, just 11 days after his 14th birthday Seán MacMahon started work in Dublin Post Office. He left on 17 September 1909 having reached the age limit of 16.

He then turned to clerical work, possibly for Plunkett Bros. Maltsters who maintained a presence, office and malthouse perhaps, at 4 and 5 Sandwith Street. He gave 5 Sandwith Street as his address when later interned in 1916. His father was at this time a foreman maltster with Plunkett Bros at this address.

Activity in Volunteers Inception 

At the inception of the Volunteers in 1913 he was enrolled as a member of "B" Company, 3rd Battalion, Dublin City Brigade.

In 1914 he became 1st Lieutenant under The O’Rahilly with promotion to captain, replacing The O’Rahilly in 1915. It is assumed that by this time he was also a very active IRB member. B Company, 3rd Battalion headquarters was at 144 Great Brunswick Street now called Pearse Street.

Easter Rising 

Easter Week 1916 he fought as Captain of "B" Company, 3rd Battalion under Eamonn De Valera in Bolands Mills with responsibility for Westland Row Train Station.

He represented "B" Company at a meeting of the Battalion Council in 144 Great Brunswick Street on the Good Friday prior to the rising. Present were Commandant De Valera, Captain Begley, Lieutenant Byrne, Lieutenant Charlie Murphy, Joseph O Connor and others. They were given precise orders as to the positions they were to occupy on the Sunday. They were informed as to the quantity of stores at their disposal. A large quantity of provisions had been purchased. Each company was to be responsible for the collection of such stores and their transport to their operational area.

"B" Company were to take over Westland Row Railway Station. They were to send a party up to Tara Street and link up with 2nd Battalion who would be in charge of Amiens Street section of the railway. They were on the other side to connect up with "A" Company on the railway at Grand Canal Quay.

Captain Mac Mahon cleared, barricaded and locked Westland Row station. Volunteers under Capt. John Mc Mahon, he was still known by his birth name, and Capt Joseph O Connor cut telephone wires and seized signal boxes. They were charged to snipe and fight running battles around the railway so as to maintain control of it. Ensuring that any reinforcements landing at Kingstown (Dún Laoghaire) would have to march to Dublin. He than sabotaged part of the line and entrenched his men about 300 yards away from the station. The railway was of enormous importance as it also ran through De Valera's command area. Its defence was entrusted to "two of his best officers" Mac Mahon and O' Connor.

Their first encounter was on Monday near Bath Avenue when Mac Mahon with seven of his men repelled soldiers from Beggars Bush Barracks and killed a sergeant major. There were nine stone archways between Westland Row and Ringsend. The volunteer marksmen attacked British soldiers from behind these protecting walls and shot at them on Great Brunswick Street ( Pearse Street) and Grand Canal Street as well as in the square of Beggars Bush Barracks.

One memorable incident stands out. When one of his own determined men was seriously wounded the problem arose as to how to get the man to hospital. Captain Mac Mahon provided a solution by taking the man to St Vincent's Hospital himself while in uniform and under fire from the British troops.

De Valera, who was getting exhausted, did towards the end of the fighting order the burning of Westland Row station but had to be persuaded by Mac Mahon not to do so. The deciding argument being that it would have most likely led also to the burning of St Andrews Church next door on Westland Row. This deciding argument story is passed down through the Mac Mahon family.

"By Thursday/Friday he was exhausted: 'I can’t trust the men – they’ll leave their posts if I fall asleep, if I don’t watch them. 'When Lt James Fitzgerald assured his O/C he’d sit by him de Valera relented and fell asleep immediately. Soon he awoke screaming. 'set fire to the railway!" De Valera insisted that papers be dipped in whiskey and used to set fore to the waiting rooms and rolling stock, but another officer, Cpt John Mc Mahon, O/C of B Company, 'eventually persuaded de Valera to reason and the fires were put out.

Surrender and deportation 

The reaction by the locals on Boland’s Mills surrender was unlike most other areas. The locals were friendly and sympathetic and they received an ovation in Grand Canal Street with offers of refuge. They were met by British officers and soldiers in Grattan Street where they laid down their weapons. The men marched into Lower Mount Street through lines of bayonets.

May 1916 he was deported and imprisoned first in Wakefield then Frongoch where he was listed as John Mc Mahon 5B Sandwith Street and finally Wormwood Scrubbs. Leo, Thomas and James Fitzgerald of 173 great Brunswick Street (Pearse Street), his future brothers in law were also interned in Frongoch. On 11 June 1916 the General Council was elected in Frongoch and on 21 June 1916 the Council called a meeting of all commissioned officers among which was Capt. J. Mc Mahon. Collins and Mulcahy. Mac Mahon and many of the future G. H. Q. Staff were present in Frongoch where the IRB was being reorganised.

In September that year in Frongoch it was suggested that a patch of ground be cultivated. Sean Mac Mahon and 2 others "being city men," asked to be shown how to do it. Eventually admitting "put us in the clink we won’t be doing any work".

On 2/11/1916 The Murphy incident started in Frongoch. Afterwards 15 hut leaders were court-martialled among whom was Sean Mac Mahon. He was defended by Gavin Duffy. He was sentenced to 28 days hard labour serving 6 of them in the camp.

Post-release 

He arrived home on Christmas Eve 1916 after the amnesty via Dún Laoghaire (Kingstown).

He was employed as a clerk on the managerial staff of the Nationality, Arthur Griffith's newspaper. He resumed his association with the Volunteers becoming Vice Commandant of the 3rd Battalion. He was held in the highest esteem by the founder and editor of the paper President Griffith. B Company 3rd Battalion was immediately reformed with Seán Quinn being elected Captain.

South Longford by-election 

Prior to May 1917 President Griffith sent Seán Mac Mahon and Joseph Curran to Longford to work on ensuring Joseph Mc Guinness was elected for Sinn Féin in the South Longford by-election. McGuinness was serving a prison term when he was elected to Westminster and among those who also worked on his election campaign was Michael Collins. The election slogan for McGuinness at the time was "Put him in to get him out!" It was narrowly won by Sinn Féin with a majority of 37 votes. Seán Mac Mahon and Joseph Curran worked hard and "we converted the hostile people who tried hard to beat us out of Newtownforbes." The election was held on 9 May 1917.

When Seán and Joseph reached Dublin on their return a number of police tried to capture a flag from them. They got several items but not the flag as it was divided between the two.

It was during the period of this election that the Volunteers were formed in the area of South Longford. The Volunteers took a very active part in the election organizing and canvassing voters, protection duty at the polling stations, bringing voters to the booths, escorting the ballot boxes and suchlike work.

On the 25th October1917 a new Sinn Féin Ard Fheis was held. De Valera was elected President of the party. Griffith and Fr Michael O Flanagan were vice-presidents. Collins barely made it onto the executive. The next day De Valera was elected President of the Irish Volunteers. Collins was appointed director of organisation of the volunteers. A 26-man executive was established. Cathal Bruagh was put in charge of the executive but it became a bit too loose. It was decided to set up a headquarters staff.

"Seven of the most prominent members of the resident executive met at the headquarters of the printers union at 35 Lower Gardener Street to select a chief of staff in March 1918. Those attending were Collins, Richard Mulcahy, Dick Mc Kee, Gearoid O Sullivan, Diarmuid O' Hegarty, Rory O’Connor and Seán Mac Mahon."

Mulcahy was elected chief of staff. In 1919 Seán Mac Mahon became Q.M.G. of the IRA. Being attached to the General Headquarters.

Marriage 

He married Lucinda Fitzgerald on Thursday 27 November 1919 in the Church of Saint Andrew, Westland Row, Dublin, that same church that he had helped save from being destroyed. They went to Ulster for their honeymoon to see Seán MacEntee, MacEntee at that time served as Vice-Commandant of the Belfast Brigade of the IRA. Their first home was in Heytesbury Street, in Dublin.  Mac Mahon was the brother in-law of Commandant Theobald Wolfe Tone FitzGerald, the painter of the Irish Republic Flag that flew over the GPO during the Easter Rising in 1916.

Q Company 

Seán Mac Mahon was the organiser of the famous Q Company based at Dublin Docks, which was finally organised into a unit in March 1921. John Kennedy was transferred from "B" Company, 3rd Battalion, Dublin Brigade, to his department to help run it. He also found time to organise the Volunteers at the various railway stations both in Dublin and throughout the country.

On another occasion, about this time, the British military carried out a raid on a business premises in Stephen's Green. Every room in the building with the exception of two were searched. One of these was the Q.M.G.'s War Office.

Many meetings took place in Whelan's Pub at 49 Parnell Street. Owned and run by James Kirwan from Tipperary. He was a member of "D" Company 2nd Battalion, Dublin Brigade. Whenever there was an important meeting being held in the snug Richard Mulcahy would preside with Seán Mac Mahon, Gearoid O Sullivan, Frank Thorton, Seán O’Connell, Michael Larken and of course Oscar Traynor these men were always present. Mick Collins was always in and out, keeping much of his funds hidden here. £3,000 at one time behind a brick in the wall of the cellar. Often used to buy arms. It was here that the escape from Kilmainham Gaol and of Sean Mac Eoin from Mountjoy were planned.

A meeting remembered by Pax Whelan (Pax O' Faoláin) about February 1921. "I was at a HQ meeting in a house on the quays. All the top people were there, Mick, Liam Mellows who was director of purchases, Cathal Brugha Minister for Defence, Rory O' Connor, Seán Mac Mahon Q.M.G., Liam Lynch and some others. They were discussing whether to bring in a boat with arms"

He took part in several engagements during the Black and Tan war and was present during the night ambush when his Brother in Law, Leo Fitzgerald was killed in Great Brunswick Street on 14 March 1921.

14 March 1921 

Dublin had awoken on the morning to 14 March 1921, to the news that six IRA Volunteers, captured in an ambush at Drumcondra two months before, had been hanged.

The Labour movement called a half-day general strike in the city in protest at the hangings. The Republican government declared a day of national mourning. All public transport came to a halt.

By the evening, the streets cleared rapidly as the British-imposed curfew came into effect at 9pm each night. It was about 8 o’clock. The curfew was approaching. A company of Auxiliaries, based in Dublin Castle was sent to the area to investigate an explosion. It consisted of one Rolls-Royce armoured car and two tenders (trucks) holding about 16 men. Apparently the Auxiliaries had some inside information as they made straight for the local IRA headquarters at 144 Pearse Street. One later testified in court that – "I had been notified there were a certain number of gunmen there". Leo, with others, was protecting his brother in law and other senior staff attending a meeting. As soon as the Auxiliaries approached the building, fire was opened on them from three sides. Firing lasted for just five minutes but in that time seven people were killed or fatally wounded and at least six more wounded. Leo Fitzgerald was killed outright.

Treaty and Civil War

The Treaty was signed on 6 December 1921.

On the formation of the Regular Army in February 1922 he continued as Q.M.G.

When Michael Collins was shot in Beal Na mBláth and buried in Dublin he carried, with others, the coffin from St Vincents Hospital Dublin to the waiting gun carriage. Michael Collins brother gave him the handkerchief that was on Collins person when he was shot.

In September 1922 he succeeded General Mulcahy as Chief of the General Staff. He was unknown not only to the Irish public but also to the British at Dublin Castle. At a reunion in Gormanstown in September 1922 General Mulcahy boasted of the great progress of the Army by indicating the newly appointed Chief of Staff as "the Army’s first real Chief of Staff"

The Army needed to be professionalised, armed and numbers increased in the short term. After the civil war ended it would have to be brought to peacetime operation and numbers reduced again.

Trouble continued in Northern Ireland with violence against the Catholics. It was considered important to continue to supply and arm the Northern Ireland IRA units. To this end the Free State Army sanctioned the surreptitious purchase of arms from a London arms dealer.

In May 1923 General Sean Mac Mahon summed up the course of events "Early last year (1922), during the programme in the North and when our men in the Northern Divisions were making every effort to deal with the situation, the demand for arms increased and every weapon we could lay our hands on was sent to one of our Northern divisions. Arms were taken from Southern units and sent up North and later we supplied them with some arms from the regular army. The position became very difficult and, after many meetings with our Northern officers, it was decided that we would procure a quantity of arms under cover to be sent in to the six counties. I went into the matter of procuring a quantity of revolvers and rifles with Mr Frank Fitzgerald (Uncle to Gareth Fitzgerald), who has been procuring materials for us for a long time…"

This deal went badly wrong with Frank Fitzgerald. General Mac Mahon approved the deal and an advance of £10,000 was given out of Army funds. The revolvers were due at the end of June 1922 however the attack to retake the Customs House was on 28, 29 and 30 June 1922. General Seán Mac Mahon was in Cork at this time. General Mac Mahon told Fitzgerald to hold things up because he was concerned that the guns may get into the wrong hands.

Things began to go badly wrong in London at the end of August 1922 and it seems that Fitzgerald may have been a rather incompetent gunrunner. He messed up one revolver deal in June by not turning up for an appointment with the arms dealer who then sold the guns to Brazil. Everything fell apart. The Free State authorities no longer had the same need for the arms having won the civil war. But whatever pressure Fitzgerald put on it was effective (He had a brother in the Cabinet and was friendly with Mulcahy and Ernest Blyth).

On 19 October 1923 Mulcahy and General Sean Mac Mahon had a meeting with W.T. Cosgrave (President of the Executive Council). Mulcahy and other Ministers went to the Dept of Finance and drew out £5,000 Then Mulcahy and General Mac Mahon caught the night boat to England to see Fitzgerald. They brokered a deal and gave him the money. Needless to say the saga continued on with the Free State threatening legal action. Some arms were received but the Cosgrave government tried to distance itself from the situation. The last word on the matter was in the Dáil in 1927 when Fianna Fáil's Frank Carney TD (Chief supplies officer Portobello 1922) commented that they fitted out a flying column from South Down/Armagh area two or three days before the attack on the Four Courts. They had been waiting on the guns from London.

On 4 November 1922 Ernie O Malley was arrested and brought to Portobello. General Sean Mac Mahon went privately to visit him.

Even before the end of the civil war in 1923 it was evident that the leadership of the National Army or "Defence Force" saw a future where they were a respected, professional, well organised army, subservient to the government of the day. That Government was following the agreement with Britain and had concerns about its military budget. At the beginning of 1923 the National Army accounted one third of all current budget expenditure by the state. The leadership of the IRA organisation wished to continue the fight for an all island Republic using whatever means but particularly a well-armed nationalist army. While the Free State government wished to shrink the National Army now that the civil war was over. Richard Mulcahy met this IRA leadership on a number of occasions but was very frustrated with them. In May 1923 the army had risen to 3,000 officers and 52,000 other ranks.

Paris visit 

During this time the state had to find its feet and day-to-day operations and services had to be provided. General Seán Mac Mahon paid an official visit to France 14 to 31 July 1923. During which he laid a wreath on the Tomb of the Unknown Soldier. He was well received by the French Military and gained much information on the running of a professional army. There was some problem with wearing an Irish Military uniform but this appeared to come more from the British representatives in Paris.

The Army Council 

Mulcahy did secure a redundancy package for the men that would have to leave the National Army and return to civilian life. Many found occupations within the civil and public services. Matters were moving along swiftly but the IRA organisation seemed deeply committed to the beliefs of the pre-truce ideals. They would refer to Mulcahy as Commander in Chief or Chief of Staff, when in fact he was the Minister of Defence and Seán Mac Mahon was the Chief of Staff and head of the National Army. They also mistakenly believed that Mulcahy was President of the IRB.

The Army Council by now accepted and took steps to action the Governments budgetary target of 1,300 officers and 30,000 other ranks by January 1924. The decisions now were not how many but who. The predicament the Army Council and in particular Mac Mahon and Mulcahy found themselves in was in large part due to their taking a stronger line against the IRA than would their political masters. Seán Mac Mahon feared the IRA organisation would turn the army "into an armed mob" instead of being" Forced into a military machine that will be the right arm of any government the people wish to place in power".

Cosgrave read the IRA's ultimatum into the record of the Dáil. Reaction particularly from the Labour party was mild. Although Labour members did join the public outcry against the IRA organisation. Some such as McGrath characterised the "Mutiny" as a row between the IRA and the IRB about how the army should be reorganised.

Mulcahy offered the IRA organisation an interview with Seán Mac Mahon. Liam Tobin agreed to meet Mac Mahon provided he came as "head of the Army". This showed the continued failure of the IRA Organization to understand the new political realities of the new state. Mulcahy made the offer because Seán Mac Mahon was President of the IRB but Liam Tobin and the IRA Organisation were not even aware of this and the significance of the offer.

As a consequence of the Army crisis in 1924 Seán Mac Mahon along with the rest of the Army Council was asked to resign. He was initially reluctant to do this and his commission was therefore withdrawn. A committee of inquiry was formed and on their recommendation he was reinstated by the Executive Council and an apology given to him in the Dáil. His commission was actually withdrawn for just one day.

He returned to serve but not as Chief of General Staff.

Retirement and death 

He retired through ill health in January 1927. Asked to go into politics he declined. The Army provided him with a house, Coolgarif in Stillorgan. He only stayed here a short time before buying a house himself in Dundrum, then County Dublin now Dublin 14. The house was called Meadowbrook. Here he stayed with his wife, Lucinda and 3 children Terence (Terry), Kathleen (Kanki) and Seán (Seánog).

He died on 26 March 1955 and is buried with his wife and two of his children in Deansgrange cemetery. He received a full state funeral. A memorial committee formed and thanks to them his grave is marked with a Celtic cross.

Memorial Bridge 

In 1966 a new bridge at Boland's Mill between Ringsend and Pearse Street was opened in his name. President Eamonn de Valera unveiled the plaques. Before the ceremony members of the Dublin Brigade IRA formed up outside 144 Pearse Street, the old Battalion HQ, under the command of Comdt Vincent Byrne and headed by a colour party under Mr P. Buttner and the St Brigid's Brass Band they marched to the Seán Mac Mahon Bridge.

This bridge was rebuilt in 2008 and rededicated in his name on 30 May 2008.

References

1893 births
1955 deaths
People of the Easter Rising